Comer William "Bill" Parnell (14 February 1928 in Vancouver – 6 September 2008) was a Canadian middle distance runner who competed in the 1948 Summer Olympics and in the 1952 Summer Olympics. He won the gold medal in the 1 mile race at the 1950 British Empire Games at Auckland. He was third in the 1950 British Empire Games 880 yards. In the 4×440 yards Relay (with Don Pettie, Jack Hutchins, and Bill LaRochelle) Parnell finished fifth. In the 1954 British Empire and Commonwealth Games 880 yards he finished seventh and in the 1954 British Empire and Commonwealth Games 1 mile he was eliminated in the heats.

References

1928 births
2008 deaths
Athletes from Vancouver
Canadian male middle-distance runners
Olympic track and field athletes of Canada
Athletes (track and field) at the 1948 Summer Olympics
Athletes (track and field) at the 1952 Summer Olympics
Athletes (track and field) at the 1950 British Empire Games
Athletes (track and field) at the 1954 British Empire and Commonwealth Games
Commonwealth Games gold medallists for Canada
Commonwealth Games bronze medallists for Canada
Commonwealth Games medallists in athletics
Medallists at the 1950 British Empire Games